Nick Molnar is a FinTech entrepreneur and is the co-founder of Afterpay.

Whilst attending Sydney's Moriah College, Molnar started trading jewellery on eBay. He graduated with a Bachelor of Commerce from the University of Sydney.

In August 2021 Afterpay and Square, Inc. (later renamed Block, Inc. in December 2021), a digital payments company, announced they had entered into arrangements for Square to acquire Afterpay for 29 billion (39 billion) which was later completed on 31 January 2022. It was reported that Molnar and co-founder, Anthony Eisen will receive 2.7 billion in Square stock for their Afterpay shares and, post-settlement, they will jointly lead Afterpay’s merchant and consumer businesses inside Square.

Net worth 
In July 2022, Business Insider Magazine stated that Molnar was the youngest Australian "self-made" billionaire. In 2020 Molnar and his wife, Gabrielle, purchased a  property for approximately 27 million; and subsequently acquired an adjoining property the following year for 18.5 million.

References

Australian billionaires
Block, Inc. employees
Living people
Australian Jews
1991 births
University of Sydney alumni
Australian company founders